Atabey Çiçek (born 24 July 1995) is a Turkish professional footballer who currently plays as a forward for Bandırmaspor on loan from İstanbul Başakşehir.

Career
Atabey Çiçek made his Turkish Süper Lig debut for İstanbul Başakşehir on 26 September 2021, coming on as a second-half substitute for Stefano Okaka against Caykur Rizespor.

References

External links
 
 

1995 births
Living people
People from Yenimahalle
Turkish footballers
Turkish expatriate footballers
Turkey B international footballers
Turkey youth international footballers
Association football forwards
Gençlerbirliği S.K. footballers
Bandırmaspor footballers
Boluspor footballers
Hacettepe S.K. footballers
Ümraniyespor footballers
Adana Demirspor footballers
Samsunspor footballers
K.V.C. Westerlo players
Süper Lig players
TFF First League players
TFF Second League players
Mediterranean Games silver medalists for Turkey
Mediterranean Games medalists in football
Competitors at the 2013 Mediterranean Games
Turkish expatriate sportspeople in Belgium
Expatriate footballers in Belgium